The Sun Bright (also known as the Sidney Johnston Catts House) is an historic residence in DeFuniak Springs, Walton County, Florida. Located at 30 Live Oak Ave W, it was the home of Sidney J. Catts, Florida's twenty-second governor. On May 7, 1979, it was added to the U.S. National Register of Historic Places.

In 1989, the house was listed in A Guide to Florida's Historic Architecture, published by the University of Florida Press.

After Governor Catts owned the house, it became a bed and breakfast until the early 2000 when it was converted back to a single family residence.

References

External links
 Walton County listings at National Register of Historic Places
 Walton County listings at Florida's Office of Cultural and Historical Programs
 Museum of Florida History: Sidney Johnston Catts

Houses on the National Register of Historic Places in Florida
Houses in Walton County, Florida
National Register of Historic Places in Walton County, Florida